Naval Air Station Whiting Field – South , also known as South Whiting Field, is located three miles (5 km) north of the central business district of Milton, in Santa Rosa County, Florida, United States. This military airport is owned by the US Navy.  It is one of two airfields located at Naval Air Station Whiting Field, the other airfield being NAS Whiting Field – North.

This airport is assigned a three-letter location identifier of NDZ by the Federal Aviation Administration, but it does not have an International Air Transport Association (IATA) airport code.

Facilities 
Whiting Field NAS-South has two runways and 12 helipads:
 Runway 5/23: 5,997 x 200 ft. (1,828 x 61 m), Surface: asphalt
 Runway 14/32: 6,001 x 200 ft. (1,829 x 61 m), Surface: asphalt
 Helipads H1, H2, H3, H4, H5: 100 x 100 ft. (30 x 30 m), Surface: asphalt
 Helipad H6: 75 x 100 ft. (23 x 30 m), Surface: asphalt
 Helipads H-A,B,C,D,E,F: 100 x 100 ft. (30 x 30 m), Surface: asphalt

See also 
 Naval Air Station Whiting Field
 NAS Whiting Field – North

References

External links 
 NAS Whiting Field (official site)
 NAS Whiting Field page at Pensacola Chamber of Commerce
 NAS Whiting Field page at GlobalSecurity.org
 

Whiting Field
Airports in Florida
Transportation buildings and structures in Santa Rosa County, Florida